is a village located in Yamanashi Prefecture, Japan.

Geography
Yamanakako is located in the far southeastern corner of Yamanashi Prefecture, surrounding Lake Yamanaka. Much of the village area is protected forest, extending to the base of Mount Fuji, which is also visible from many locations.

Neighboring municipalities
Yamanashi Prefecture
Fujiyoshida
Tsuru
Oshino
Dōshi
Kanagawa Prefecture
Yamakita
Shizuoka Prefecture
Oyama

Climate
The village has a climate characterized by hot and humid summers, and relatively mild winters (Köppen climate classification Cfb).  The average annual temperature in Yamanakako is 9.4 °C. The average annual rainfall is 1876 mm with September as the wettest month.

Demographics
Per Japanese census data, the population of Yamanakako has recently plateaued after a long period of growth.

History
Numerous Jōmon period remains have been found near Lake Yamanaka, and ancient Tsuru County, of which the area is a part, is mentioned in the late Nara period Engishiki records. The area was a contested border region between the Takeda clan, Imagawa clan and Odawara Hōjō clan during the Sengoku period.

During the Edo period, all of Kai Province was tenryō territory under direct control of the Tokugawa shogunate. With the establishment of the modern municipalities system in the early Meiji period in 1875, the village of Nakano was created within Minamitsuru District, Yamanashi Prefecture by the merger of Yamanaka and Hirano hamlets. This village was renamed Yamanakako Village on January 1, 1965.

Economy
The economy of Yamanakako is primarily based on tourism and agriculture.

Education
Yamanakako has one public elementary school and one public junior high school, and one combined elementary/middle school, all operated by the village government. The village does not have a high school.

Transportation

Railway
Yamanakako has no railway service.

Highway
  Higashifuji-goko Road

Local attractions
Lake Yamanaka
Mishima Yukio Literary Museum

References

External links

Official Website 

 
Villages in Yamanashi Prefecture